BlueCentral Hosting   was an Australian hosting company that was formed from the destra Hosting business in 2007. Effective 1 December 2016, the Australian Hannan family business, whose parent company is the Independent Print Media Group IPMG, sold Blue Central to Nexon Asia Pacific, effectively ending the brand.

As a hosting company, BlueCentral provided and operated computing infrastructure for major Australian companies, corporations and events such as National Australia Bank and the CYC Sydney-Hobart Yacht Race.

History  
The history of the BlueCentral company is a fascinating reflection of the dot-com industry at the time and includes the following mergers, acquisitions and takeovers;
 Sprint Corporation was formed in the mid-1990s by Domenic and Anna Carosa, as the fore-runner to the OzHosting and destra businesses.  Ozhosting.com was formed in 1995 to provide retail hosting only as part of Sprint Corporation (destra's former name).
 Sprint Corporation bought BlueFire (now with Dimension Data), GlobalHost and various other smaller hosting companies to operate under the OzHosting.com brand.
 Sprint Corporation was renamed Ehyou.com in 2000, and this business bought many smaller firms including mp3.com.au, OzHosting (with Brett Gorlin), Sprint Web and Sprint Design (Anna Carosa). Other companies purchased before 2001 included Domains and Servers, Monica and Webology.
 Ehyou was renamed as Destra Corporation. The small "d" was deliberate in the official name "destra" and the name meant "right" or "on the right" in Italian and was intended as a play-on-words to mean "having the right and being correct".
 In 2001 Cyberhost, Iasiaworks and Ocean Internet's hosting division were also purchased. The ISP component of Ocean Internet was picked up by Data Fast. This included the rights to run the www.realestate.au website.
 destra bought Webtrader  in January 2001, which was Anthony Banek's own company and this was integrated under the OzHosting.com brand making OzHosting.com the second largest retail hosting company in Australia (behind Webcentral, which is now owned by Melbourne IT).
 Anthony Banek formed OzHosting.com Advanced the Enterprise division of OzHosting.com  and destra, later to become BlueCentral Enterprise (BCE)
 Destra, including OzHosting.com Advanced, purchased Enet21 in 2002. ENet21 was the company that first commissioned hosting space at Fujitsu, North Ryde as one of their earliest customers. Destra also purchased 13 other smaller companies at this time. SuperHosting was also purchased in 2002
 destra then purchased TPP Internet being a Domain Name Registrar. Destra owned 80% of TTP and the other 20% remained with former owner, Peter Schilling. It remained a separate entity.
 In 2003, Ice Blue Hosting was purchased, and was the first acquisition of destra, that included managed dedicated hosting services.
 destra then purchased Techex Communications which was a business VPN, Internet Connectivity provider. Destra also ran divisions for destra Media, destra Communications and destra Hosting
 OzHosting.com, OzHosting Advanced and Techex were integrated under one brand called – destra Business and as a result, the OzHosting.com brand was shelved in 2004. TPP remained a separate entity.
 Destra Media bought Visual Entertainment Corporation and Central Station Records and became the fifth largest Record Label in Australia.
 Due to the pending sale and failure of the parent company Destra Corporation, destra Business was split into destra hosting and destra communications ready for sale of both divisions
 BlueFreeway purchased the destra Hosting business in 2007 when it listed on the ASX. It was basically OzHosting.com and OzHosting Advanced plus three other smaller businesses.
 TPP was bought back from destra by original founder in 2006, who was Peter Schilling.
 Intrapower brought the Internet connectivity business called destra Communications in 2007.
 IPMG purchased Blue Freeway and de-listed this public company from the ASX. The five subsidiary businesses became part of the IPMG Digital Media Group, with 14 companies in total.
 In 2007 IPMG rebranded destra Hosting as BlueCentral. AJ was the MD. Technical staff from BlueCentral were moved into BlueFreeway to create a new marketing front end for BF business. This failed and caused considerable consternation amongst staff.
 In 2008, after the Opus Prime debacle, Domenic Carosa bought back the destra name.
 In 2009 BlueCentral relaunched Ozhosting.com into Retail space using the Parallels, Inc. platform to provide inexpensive shared hosting that would be auto-provisioned on Virtuoso containers or VPS's.
 In November 2009, Graeme Watts joined BlueCentral from Macquarie Telecom, as the Sales Director for BC Enterprise and Mobility.
 In April 2010, Olaf Moon  joined BlueCentral as Managing Director   reporting to David Burkett in the IPMG Digital Media Group. Anthony Banek  became GM Cloud Services, to run the BlueCentral Shared and OzHosting business, as subsidiaries of BlueCentral.
 In June 2010, IPMG moved to expunge the BlueFreeway name from all operational parts of the IPMG Group, retaining BlueCentral and the principle company name and trading group.
 In October 2011, IPMG sold OzHosting.com back to Anthony Banek under an Management Buy Out along with Newly appointed Directors and Share Holders - Doug Endersbee and Jason Frisch - 
 In December 2016, Blue Central was sold to Nexon Asia Pacific for an undisclosed sum, and the brand effectively ceased to exist, with all services being provided via Nexon's hosted infrastructure.

Services 
These businesses became core to corporate IT from about 2003 onwards. The BlueCentral services have centralised classic hosting business models including;
 web hosting service
 shared web hosting service
 software as a service
 dedicated hosting service
 reseller hosting
 Infrastructure as a service
 co-location hosting
 colocation centre

References

External links 
 BlueCentral website
 Parent Corporation IPMG
 

Web hosting
Internet technology companies of Australia